"Every Man Has a Woman Who Loves Him" is a song by Yoko Ono from the album Double Fantasy with John Lennon.  Other versions were released, including one released as a single where Ono's voice was removed, leaving what had been Lennon's backing vocal as the primary vocal.

Yoko Ono original version
Music lecturers Ben Urish and Ken Bielen described Ono's original version on Double Fantasy as having a "reggae feel." They regard the theme of the song to be the "preordained nature of soul mates" although the lyrics acknowledge that one might not find their soul mate in this lifetime.  They point to the line "Why do I run, when I know you're the one" as recognizing that people may be hesitant to accept the inevitability their soul mate.  Beatle biographer John Blaney feels that the theme restates much of what Ono had already sung on the album in "Beautiful Boys."  According to Ono, the song is "about love."

Ultimate Classic Rock critic Michael Gallucci rated this version to be Ono's 5th best song, preferring it to the version with only Lennon's vocals.

John Lennon version
A new version of the song was created for the compilation album Every Man Has a Woman. It stripped away Ono's lead vocal, while bringing Lennon's backing vocal up in the mix thus making it effectively a John Lennon song.  Ono can still be heard singing effectively backup in parts of the refrain.  Besides eliminating Ono's lead vocal, this version also eliminates a short instrumental part.  Urish and Bielen speculate that Lennon created this mix before he died in anticipation of putting together an album of other artists performing Ono's songs as a birthday present to her.

It was released as a single with B-side featuring "It's Alright" by Ono and Sean Lennon. The last "new" John Lennon song to be released as a single, it failed to chart in the United Kingdom but charted at #52 on the Mainstream Rock chart in the United States. This version was included on the 1990 Lennon compilation album Lennon.  It was also released as a bonus track on the CD reissue of Milk and Honey.  

In 2007, the song was re-released as a UK-only 12" single on the Mynx record label where it was coupled with Elvis Costello's cover version of Yoko Ono's song "Walking on Thin Ice".

Blaney criticized this version for using Lennon's harmony vocal as a lead vocal, which, according to Blaney "it is not."

Personnel 
This is the personnel according to the John Lennon Website.

 John Lennon – vocals, guitar, keyboards
 Yoko Ono – vocals
 Earl Slick – guitar
 Hugh McCracken – guitar
 Tony Levin – bass guitar
 George Small – keyboards
 Ed Walsh – Oberheim
 Andy Newmark – drums
 Arthur Jenkins – percussion
 George "Young" Opalisky – saxophone

Track listing
UK 7" single
A. "Every Man Has a Woman Who Loves Him" (by John Lennon) – 3:32
AA. "It's Alright" (by Sean Lennon) – 2:26

"Everyman... Everywoman..."

"Every Man Has a Woman Who Loves Him" was later released as a single by Yoko Ono in 2004 under the title "Everyman... Everywoman...".  The lyrics were altered for this version to allow for same-sex relationships.  A remix version by Blow-Up was later included on Ono's 2007 remix album Yes, I'm a Witch.  Allmusic critic Thom Jurek called the Blow-Up remix "a full-on psychedelic rave-up worthy of the Kinks circa 1965.

Track listing
Digital download
 "Everyman... Everywoman..." (Basement Jaxx Classix MAN2MAN Mix) – 4:02
 "Everyman... Everywoman..." (Murk Space Miami Mix) – 5:17
 "Everyman... Everywoman..." (Dave Audé Radio Edit) – 3:51
 "Everyman... Everywoman..." (Blow-Up Radio Edit) – 3:57
 "Everyman... Everywoman..." (Basement Jaxx Night Dub) – 5:45
 "Everyman... Everywoman..." (Ralphi Rosario Main Mix) – 8:04
 "Everyman... Everywoman..." (DJ Vibe Mix) – 8:05
 "Everyman... Everywoman..." (Passengerz Ono Mixshow) – 6:24
 "Everyman... Everywoman..." (Dave Audé Dub) – 8:27
 "Everyman... Everywoman..." (Basement Jaxx Club Mix 2) – 7:11
 "Everyman... Everywoman..." (Blow Up Plastic Mix) – 5:42
 "Everyman... Everywoman..." (Basement Jaxx Classix Mix) – 4:00

Charts

See also
 List of number-one dance singles of 2004 (U.S.)

References

John Lennon songs
Yoko Ono songs
1980 songs
1984 singles
2004 singles
Song recordings produced by Jack Douglas (record producer)
Song recordings produced by John Lennon
Song recordings produced by Yoko Ono
Geffen Records singles
Songs written by Yoko Ono